Geórgia Quental (23 April 1939 – 19 November 2022) was a Brazilian actress and model.

Early life 
Geórgia Quental was born in Porto Alegre, but her family moved to Rio de Janeiro when she was a baby.

Career 
Quental first worked as a model and in advertisements.  She won the title of Miss Rio Grande do Norte in 1962.  

Quental made her television debut in 1959, appearing on Brazilian singer Cauby Peixoto's program on TV Continental.  

Geórgia Quental appeared in many prestigious Brazilian telenovelas, including TV Globo's "Sangue e Areia" (1967–1968),  "A Grande Famiíia" (1972), and "Jogo da Vida" (1981).    

Quental appeared in twelve movies, including Copacabana Palace (1962), Boca de Ouro (1963) appearing with Jece Valadão, and Com as Calças na Mão with Carlo Mossy (1976).  

Quental's final television appearance came in 1991's telenovela "Araponga".

Personal life and death 
Quental died on 19 November 2022, at the age of 83.

Partial filmography 
 Copacabana Palace (1962)
 Boca de Ouro (1963)
 Un Ramo para Luíza (1954)
 Carnaval Barra Limpa (1967)
 Com as Calças na Mão (1976)

References

External links 
 

1939 births
2022 deaths
Brazilian actresses
Actresses from Rio Grande do Sul
People from Porto Alegre